Strinda is a former municipality in the old Sør-Trøndelag county, Norway. The  municipality existed from 1838 until its dissolution in 1964. The municipality encompassed the eastern part of what is now the municipality of Trondheim south and east of the main city center all the way southeast to the lake Jonsvatnet, and it originally included what is now the municipality of Malvik. The western part of the municipality was heavily urbanized, while the areas further east and south were more suburban. The administrative centre was actually located in the neighboring city of Trondheim, just across the Nidelva river on the Kjøpmansgata road.

History
The municipality of Strinda was established on 1 January 1838 (see formannskapsdistrikt). According to the 1835 census, Strinda had a population of 4,593.  In 1891, the eastern parish of Malvik (population: 2,487) was separated from Strinda to form its own municipality, leaving Strinda with a population of 2,769.

Starting in 1864, a series of border adjustments moved territory from Strinda municipality to the neighboring city of Trondheim. On 1 January 1864, an area with 1,229 residents was transferred; then on 1 January 1893, an area with 4,097 residents was transferred; and finally on 1 January 1952, the Lade area with 2,230 inhabitants was transferred to Trondheim.

During the 1960s, there were many municipal mergers across Norway due to the work of the Schei Committee. On 1 January 1964, the neighboring municipalities of Byneset (population: 2,049), Leinstrand (population: 4,193), Strinda (population: 44,600), Tiller (population: 3,595), and the city of Trondheim (population: 56,982) were merged to form the new urban municipality of Trondheim which would have a total population of 111,419.

Government
All municipalities in Norway, including Strinda, are responsible for primary education (through 10th grade), outpatient health services, senior citizen services, unemployment and other social services, zoning, economic development, and municipal roads. The municipality is governed by a municipal council of elected representatives, which in turn elects a mayor.

Municipal council
The municipal council  of Strinda was made up of 49 representatives that were elected to four year terms. The party breakdown of the final municipal council was as follows:

See also
List of former municipalities of Norway

References

External links
Strinda historielag 
WikiStrinda. 

Former municipalities of Norway
Geography of Trondheim
1838 establishments in Norway
1964 disestablishments in Norway